Herbert Hoover High School (HHHS) is a public high school in Elkview, West Virginia, United States. It is part of the Kanawha County Schools district.

History 
During the 2016 West Virginia flood, the school building was damaged beyond repair on June 23, 2016 when the Elk River put 7 feet of water into the school. On July 21, 2016 the Federal Emergency Management Agency (FEMA) declared the building a total loss and the Kanawha County School Board began expedited plans for a new building, however several delays prevented the advancement of the project, and the new facility is not expected to be opened until approximately 2022. For the 2016–17 school year, students shared space, via a split schedule, with Elkview Middle School. This involved each group attending school for four-and-one-half hours per day with reading and homework assignments. A temporary campus of modified mobile home-type units known as "modulars" was constructed adjacent to the middle school, and a normal schedule was resumed for the 2017–18 school year. FEMA provided the modulars and will fund approximately 75 to 80% of the cost for the new building. The old, damaged building was demolished in September 2018.

Notable alumni
Corey Bird, baseball player

References

External links 
 

Schools in Kanawha County, West Virginia
Public high schools in West Virginia